Jos Schurgers (born 18 February 1947, Haarlem) is a former Grand Prix motorcycle road racer from the Netherlands. He had his best years in 1971 when he finished the 50cc season in third place behind Jan de Vries and Angel Nieto, and in 1973 when he won the 125cc race in the Belgian Grand Prix and finished the 125cc season again in third place, this time to Kent Andersson and Chas Mortimer.

References 

1947 births
Living people
Dutch motorcycle racers
50cc World Championship riders
125cc World Championship riders
Sportspeople from Haarlem